Río de Agua de Vida Airstrip  is a private dirt airstrip located  4 km South West of La Purísima, Municipality of Comondú, Baja California Sur, Mexico. It is owned and operated by Mexican Medical Ministries, a religious non-profit organization that provides health care services to the locals. The airstrip is used solely for general aviation. The code MMI is used unofficially as an identifier.

External links
Mexican Medical Ministries.

Airports in Baja California Sur
Comondú Municipality